DALI may refer to:

 Danish Audiophile Loudspeaker Industries
 Dark Ages Lunar Interferometer, a proposal for a moon-based low-frequency radio observatory, funded under the Astrophysics Strategic Mission Concept Study program
 Dartmouth Assessment of Lifestyle Instrument, a questionnaire for assessing substance abuse disorders
 Digital Addressable Lighting Interface
 The "Distance-matrix ALIgnment" algorithm used in the FSSP database on structurally similar proteins

See also
 Dali (disambiguation)

de:DALI
fr:Dali
nl:Dali